James Todd (19 March 1921 – 21 December 2007) was a footballer from Northern Ireland who played for Port Vale between 1946 and 1953. A half-back, he was "a real terrier type who used to fight for the ball all the time".

Career
Todd began his playing career with Ards, before playing for the Royal Air Force and then Blackpool, before moving to Port Vale for a then-club-record four-figure fee in October 1946, on the recommendation of Stanley Matthews. He made 31 appearances in the Third Division South in 1946–47, 24 appearances in 1947–48, and 11 appearances in 1948–49. Having slipped out of the first team picture at The Old Recreation Ground, he returned to play 41 games in 1949–50. However, he played only eight games in 1950–51, becoming a fringe player at newly constructed Vale Park. In the summer, manager Gordon Hodgson died, and following Ivor Powell's brief tenure, Freddie Steele took charge of the club in November. Todd played 25 times in 1951–52, and then made 11 league appearances in 1952–53, as Vale finished as runners-up in the Third Division North. Having played 146 league and eleven FA Cup games for the "Valiants", he was given a free transfer to Cheshire County League side Wellington Town in May 1953. Todd later played for Stafford Rangers.

Career statistics
Source:

References

1921 births
2007 deaths
Association footballers from Belfast
Association footballers from Northern Ireland
Association football midfielders
Ireland (IFA) wartime international footballers
Ards F.C. players
Royal Air Force personnel of World War II
Blackpool F.C. players
Port Vale F.C. players
Telford United F.C. players
Stafford Rangers F.C. players
English Football League players